Antestor is a Norwegian Christian extreme metal band formed in 1990 in Jessheim. Credited for starting the northern European Christian black metal scene, Antestor is the only Christian band to have an album released by Cacophonous Records, which has also released records by bands such as Dimmu Borgir, Sigh, and Cradle of Filth. The band's only release on Cacophonous, The Return of the Black Death, proved influential for the Christian black metal movement, and has sold over 10,000 copies.

In the late 1990s they dubbed their musical style as "sorrow metal" rather than black metal because the black metal movement was publicly affiliated with Satanism in Norway. According to HM magazine, the progressive elements on the debut album, Martyrium, were possibly ahead of their time in the Norwegian extreme metal scene.

The group has gone through several line-up changes over the years, and currently Antestor consists of the founding guitarist Lars Stokstad (Vemod), vocalist Ronny Hansen (Vrede), bassist Erik Normann Aanonsen, guitarist Robert Bordevick, and drummer Henning Børven. The original vocalist Kjetil Molnes (Martyr) and drummer Svein Sander (Armoth) left the band around 2000, and the members of a fellow Norwegian black metal group, Vaakevandring, joined Antestor. The reputable Norwegian extreme metal drummer Jan Axel Blomberg (Hellhammer) played session drums for their 2005 album The Forsaken and Det tapte liv EP. A fourth studio album, Omen, was released in 2012.

History

Crush Evil era
In 1990, the band was formed under the name Crush Evil by Lars Stokstad, Kjetil Molnes, Øyvind Hope and Erling Jørgensen in Jessheim, Norway. Paul W joined them as a drummer later on. Back then, the band's music style was a mixture of death metal, doom metal, and thrash metal.
In 1991, they recorded and released their first demo, The Defeat of Satan, which contains three songs and an outro. The band is Christian and over the course of their career have received death threats because of this.

The existence of the band itself caused a debate in the metal underground. For example, during the early 1990s, Bård Faust of Emperor brought up the subject when he discussed with Euronymous, guitarist/vocalist from the seminal black metal band Mayhem, in his zine Orcustus about the Norwegian scene. Faust asked: "Don't you think that something is terribly wrong when it has gone so far that we have a Christian "death metal" band here (Crush Evil)? Any advice on how we should kill them?" Euronymous replied to this: "It's bad enough to have a couple of society bands, but a Christian band is too much. But don't worry, we have plans. They will not continue for a very long time." However, the band persevered despite these threats. Antestor was never forced to split apart, and in an almost ironic twist of fate, Jan Axel Blomberg (better known as Hellhammer, the drummer for Mayhem) was Antestor's session drummer on their latest two releases.

Martyrium (1993–1996)

In 1993, Vegard Undal joined the band as a bassist and Svein Sander became their drummer. During that time, they changed the name Crush Evil to Antestor, which is Latin for "to call to witness" or "testify". Despair was their first self-released demo, and was released under the band name Antestor. The demo starts with an intro and ends with a cover of an old Norwegian hymn, called Jesus, Jesus, Ver Du Hjå Meg ("Jesus, Jesus, Be With Me"). Strawberry Records pressed 600 copies of the recording.

In December 1994, Antestor recorded their first full-length album titled Martyrium. Arctic Serenades Records was originally supposed to release that album, but because of unknown reasons that never happened, and the band tried to get another label to release the album. American-based label Morphine Records would subsequently distribute bootleg copies of the album in 1997. In an interview, the drummer Armoth said: "...we were in contact with a label called Morphine Records. But that was about signing a deal for the Martyrium album. But we never signed a contract but that guy, Burrito, made several promotapes and sold every bit of it illegally 'cause he didn't have a contract." However, the tape copies circulated in up to fifth generation copies and their audience grew fast. Martyrium was the last album that emphasized the band's death/doom direction.

On June 3, 1994 Antestor appeared on a local television program called "BootlegTV" where youth could practice and experience recording and video production. Usually local bands from Oslo played on that program which was broadcast on the television station TVNorge. During the course of this program, Antestor played five songs from Martyrium. On June 6, 1995 Antestor was featured on the Norwegian weekly newspaper Morgenbladets article about the phenomenon of Christian black metal, surrounding the black metal parody controversy of the Australian unblack metal group Horde's 1994 album Hellig Usvart. In the article, vocalist Kjetil Molnes explains the band's stance on if a Christian band can play black metal: "We identify ourselves as black metal as a music style, not black metal as an ideology or belief."

The Return of the Black Death (1997–1998)

In 1997, Antestor recorded a promotional CD titled Kongsblod. The promo-CD caught the interest of British Cacophonous Records, one of the biggest labels with experience in the black metal style and helped established groups such as Cradle of Filth and Dimmu Borgir start their career. Cacophonous signed a record deal for 2 albums with Antestor. In 1998, Cacophonous released Kongsblod under a different name, The Return of the Black Death, and changed the original cover art of a famous Norwegian painting to artwork by Joe Petagno, a well-known American heavy metal cover art creator.

Cacophonous being a secular label releasing material by a band that held Christian beliefs generated some interest in the metal scene. In an interview with Art for the Ears Webzine, published on December 12, 1998, Armoth said: "We sent the CD and a short biography. They just wanted to sign us because of the music. And that's exactly what we wanted to do." 2 years later in a 2000 interview with the Finnish The Christian Underground Zine issue 4, the fanzine's interviewer asked Antestor: "However, you had a record deal with Cacophonous Records (ex-Cradle of Filth, Bal-Sagoth). What kind of experiences did you get from that?" The band replied: "Pretty bad, actually. I can not say they did anything else than released the album. No money, no royalties, nothing." The interviewer also asked: "Did the record company set any demands concerning your image?" Antestor replied: "Nothing like that. They just said that it is not recommendable for us to proclaim exactly everywhere that we are a Christian band, and they censored the words 'Lord' and 'Jesus' from our lyrics. We ourselves removed a few texts because we did not want to provoke unnecessarily."

The Return of the Black Death was mostly well received by both Christian and non-Christian black metal fans and critics. For example, the British metal magazines Kerrang! and Terrorizer both gave the album 4 points out of 5. Musically, The Return of the Black Death is a mixture of black metal and doom metal. The album relies on hypnotic, cold atmosphere and showcases influences from Norwegian folk music, which led some to label Antestor as Viking metal. Unlike previously, around this time the band themselves said they felt uncertain whether a Christian band can play black metal, because the movement was still strongly associated with Satanism. The drummer Svein Sander says in the 1998 interview:

The Forsaken (2000–2009)

In 2000, Antestor was signed by Endtime Productions, a metal record label that also helped to start the career of the Norwegian metal band Extol. The original vocalist Kjetil Molnes (Martyr) left Antestor. However, the breakup of another Christian metal band in Norway, Vaakevandring, led to several former Vaakevandring members joining Antestor. Namely, Ronny Hansen, adopting the new moniker Vrede, became Antestor's new vocalist, and Morten Sigmund Mageroy (known in Antestor as Sygmoon) stepped in as the new keyboardist. Ann-Mari Edvardsen, who has sung in the Norwegian gothic metal group The Third and the Mortal, joined the band as a female vocalist. For the first time in their career, Antestor began using the infamous corpse paint masks as a part of their live shows and overall image.

In 2000, Endtime Productions released Martyrium with cover art done by the reputive Swedish metal music cover artist Kristian Wåhlin. Antestor toured the United States with Extol that year, playing small venues and finally performing at Cornerstone Festival. Over the next several years, the band remained somewhat quiet; they did not release any more albums until 2003, when they re-released their two earliest demos on one CD, titling it The Defeat of Satan. The drummer Svein Sander left the band during this time, and Antestor would not find a new full-time drummer for several years.

In 2004, Antestor changed their style into a more modern black metal, and released their first set of new songs since The Return of the Black Death in an EP called Det tapte liv ("The Lost Life"). Det tapte liv concentrated less on the black metal aspects of Antestor's style, instead focusing more on instrumental songs.  However, it hinted at what the band was preparing for their 2005 full-length, The Forsaken. The cover arts for both releases were once again done by Kristian Wåhlin, and the cover for the EP depicts the Borgund Stave Church. Hellhammer played all drums on both of these releases. In an interview with the Russian metal site Metal Library on January 7, 2007, Blomberg was asked what did his Mayhem colleagues and record company think about his participation in Antestor, and he said: "To be honest, it was a big 'fuck off!' to them all. I will repeat again that I decide what I do and I play not only in black metal groups." The band also asked Hellhammer to play live for them, but Blomberg refused. Hellhammer also went to state: "In my opinion, black metal today is just music. I will tell you that neither I nor other members of Mayhem never really were against religion or something else. We are primarily interested in music." Ronny Hansen commented on Blomberg's appearance:

New drummer Tony Kirkemo joined the band later in 2005 as live session drummer. The band played live shows rarely and only at explicitly Christian music festivals. Examples of performances the group have made in 2000s include the concerts at Bobfest in 2000 in Stockholm and 2004 in Linköping, and at the Nordic Fest 2004 in Oslo.

Some of the members still play in the black metal band Vaakevandring, who played a reunion concert in 2007 together with Antestor at the Endtime Festival held at the end of March 2007 in Halmstad. Antestor performed the concert with numerous session musicians. In this concert the band announced that this is their last live show for a while.

 Omen (2010–present) 
After three years of hiatus, on January 29, 2010, the band launched an official Facebook page. Later they announced new members: Bassist Thor Georg Buer (Grave Declaration), guitarist Robert Bordevik (Grievance, Vardøger), drummer Jo Henning Børven (Grave Declaration, Morgenroede) and keyboardist Nickolas Main Henriksen (Aspera, Desdemon). With this line-up, the band played a stage show at Nordic Fest 2010 in Oslo. On November 4, 2010 they announced signing to Bombworks Records to record a new album and an EP. After some line-up changes in mid-2011, Erik Normann Aanonsen (Moddi) joined on bass while Thor Georg switched to guitar, and the show at the Norwegian Seaside Festival was with that line-up. The album has been recorded and will be mixed and mastered in Sweden.  Guitarist Thor also left the band to focus on his college education, but stated he may return if the opportunity arises. The fourth album, Omen, was released on November 30, 2012. A Brazilian tour was announced for early 2013. During the Belo Horizonte leg of this tour, the band faced a protest organized by Black Metal/Anti-Christianity radicals who rejected the possibility of a Christian black metal band to perform in the city. Since the radicals were already announcing their intentions via Internet, the local police had assigned one private policeman in addition to the 30 security guards present to help guaranteeing the security of the show. At one point, the officer had to fire some shots towards the sky to control the rioters. A video posted on YouTube shows a group of radicals screaming "Fuck You Antestor!" outside the venue and the local police escorting the band members.

After the show, the band posted a public statement about the incident, thanking their fans for coming despite of the risks involved, and blessing the radicals: "We are proud to call you our brothers and sisters in Christ. Last but not least we must thank the gig securety and the Belo Horizonte police for escorting us though the angry mob. [...] We do not hate the angry mob who came to hurt us. In fact, our message in our shows is to love your enemy. So God bless everybody who stood outside chanting: Fuck Antestor! Hope we can talk like reasonable people someday over a fresh squeezed juice. Extra special hails to our fans who had the balls to come although they knew it could be dangerous. Antestor salutes you and be blessed." In a newspaper interview with the Norwegian Christian newspaper Dagen two days following the band's safe return to Norway, bassist Erik Normann Aanonsen said that he had prepared himself for the worst-case scenario that the tour could end in death, and he reiterates the band's gratitude to the aggressive Brazilian Satanists stating: "We're now twice as big in Brazil as we were before we went there."

On April 12, 2015, guitarist Robert Bordevik announced his departure from the band. After Bordevik's departure, Rolfsen returned to the band as their guitarist. Bordevik also returned to the band, as their bassist.

On the band’s Facebook page in 2022 they announced to their fans that they have new songs written. But due to not getting a record deal yet, they said they couldn’t release a new album yet.

Style

Music
While the band's style on the first publications was primarily death/doom with correspondingly slow songs and death growl singing, the band began playing black metal on the 1998 album The Return of the Black Death. On that album the band showcased screaming vocals, tremolo guitar riffs and drum passages with increased speed typical for the black metal genre. Keyboard is also in a central role, which for the typical black metal is used to perform epic interludes and dominates the soundscapes. For example, over the first three minutes of the song "Sorg", only the keyboard melody leads the performance.

With the third album The Forsaken the band developed more in the direction of a more technical style, as it is apparent on the style of The Return of the Black Death. The band's musical development resulted in that The Forsaken includes several guitar solos. Also the quality of production compared to The Return of the Black Death improved. Through the introduction of the two ex-members of Vaakevandring, the style became more melodic and atmospheric.

Lyrics
Antestor's lyrical themes include hope and despair, but also deal with the personal Christian faith of the band members. Therefore, many metal fans oppose classifying Antestor's style to the category of black metal, as their lyrics are often contrary to the ideology of black metal. The lyrics are mostly in English. Norwegian texts are also rare for the group, but on the album The Return of the Black Death the Norwegian language dominates the lyrics. On this album, only part of the lyrics are listed in the booklet; words directly referring to Jesus Christ and God were omitted. The song "A Sovereign Fortress" dealt with, for example, the acknowledgments of God who protects and supports the lyrical I since birth. It is portrayed in the chorus of this song as:

"Sorg" (Norwegian for: grief, sorrow, sadness), however, deals with the themes of the sorrow and the search for hope, with the song based on darker imagery, and the lyrics are not explicitly Christian yet are not negative in the end. An example (in the Norwegian language):

Another song that is also a dark, but this takes on Christian theme, is "Ancient Prophecy". The lyrics tells that the man was sinful, and no one can escape the court of God. Antestor process in their lyrics also topics such as suicide, doubts about the certainty of salvation, and longing death, all of which are rare themes for a Christian band, however common to several subdivisions of Black metal, such as DSBM. An example from the text "Betrayed" from the album The Forsaken:

Appearance

Antestor are one of the few bands in the Christian metal scene who use corpse paint in their appearances and on photos. One example is the booklet photos in the album The Return of the Black Death, depicting Antestor in Norsemen outfits and black and white face paints at a snowy Norwegian mountain location. Sometimes the group uses art blood, as known for the session bassist Ravn Furfjord's (Frosthardr) appearance at the Bobfest 2004 concert. The band explains that corpse paint "is the same for us as masking is for actors or mimes; One way to express certain feelings in the battle we are in. The main purpose is to concentrate on God and not to break a lance in side issues like these."

Reception
According to Vrede in an interview with Intense Radio on December 13, 2007, "by various sources, The Return of the Black Death has sold over 10,000 copies and still keeps selling."

Very few published reviews of the band's albums exist, yet the ones that are available are positive, often good and some excellent. Michael Bryzak writes in the liner notes of The Defeat of Satan / Despair that, although the first album was not officially released until 2000, "Martyrium was rightfully considered a cult classic."

The group's position in the Norwegian metal scene was controversial from the beginning. Bryzak writes that "standing up for their faith in Life and Hope, Antestor received serious death threats during this time from some of the major bands and key players of the scene." When asked if the band ever played with other groups in the black metal scene, Antestor said in a 2000 interview with Tcu zine: "We played with some early form of the band Old Man's Child once. Apparently they expressed their opinion of us with their legs and walked out of the venue during our set. It was their way of saying 'screw you Christians.'" In the liner notes of Martyrium, Antestor corresponds in a slightly bitter tone: "For those of you who despised us, disbelieved in us and misplaced your anger upon us, may God have mercy on your poor souls!"

On Antestor's achievements, Bryzak wrote that "The birth of northern Europe's Christian extreme metal scene can be attributed to only one act, Antestor." In 2010, HM Magazine ranked The Return of the Black Death number 40 on their Top 100 Christian metal albums of all-time list with Beck stating about the album, "Devastatingly dark, TRBD set the standard for Christian black metal."
Jamie Lee Rake of HM Magazine wrote of the Endtime Productions re-release of Martyrium, wondering if the progressive elements of the album made the band unnoticed innovators in the early Norwegian extreme metal scene:

MembersCurrentFormerSession musicians Jan Axel Blomberg (Hellhammer) (2004) – session drums on The Forsaken
 Ann-Mari Edvardsen – session vocals on The Forsaken
 Tora – session vocals on MartyriumLive musiciansFionnghuala (Slechtvalk) – vocals (2000, 2007)
 Ravn "Jokull" Furfjord (Frosthardr) – bass (2005–2006)
 Trond Bjørnstad (Vaakevandring) – bass (2007)
 Pål "Savn" Dæhlen – drums (2001–2003)
 Tony Kirkemo – drums (2003–2006)
 Gustav "Gurra" Elowson (Crimson Moonlight) – drums (2007)Timeline Note: Martyrium was recorded in 1994, with some bootleg copies leaked, but not officially released until 2000

 Discography Studio albums The Return of the Black Death (1998)
 Martyrium (2000, recorded in 1994)
 The Forsaken (2005)
 Omen (2012)EPs Det tapte liv (2004)Demos The Defeat of Satan (1991)
 Despair (1993)
 Kongsblod (1998, promotional)Compilations'''
 The Defeat of Satan'' (2003)

References

External links

 Official website 
 CMnexus profile

Norwegian unblack metal musical groups
Norwegian death metal musical groups
Norwegian doom metal musical groups
Norwegian symphonic black metal musical groups
Musical groups established in 1990
1990 establishments in Norway
People from Jessheim
Musical groups from Akershus
Rowe Productions artists